All About Urbie Green and His Big Band (also referred to as All About Urbie),  is an album by trombonist Urbie Green which was recorded in 1956 and released on the ABC-Paramount label.

Reception

Jason Ankeny of AllMusic states, "John Carisi's thoughtful arrangements nevertheless place Green squarely at center stage, and if anything, the large settings and friendly competition seem to galvanize his solos. No matter how many players join in on a particular track, there's no question about who's in charge".

Track listing
 "Cherokee" (Ray Noble) – 2:33
 "I Ain't Got Nobody" (Spencer Williams, Robert A. Graham) – 3:28
 "Stella by Starlight" (Victor Young, Ned Washington) – 3:00
 "Little John" (John Carisi) – 3:09
 "With The Wind And The Rain In Your Hair" (Jack Lawrence, Clara Edwards) – 3:07
 "'Round Midnight" (Thelonious Monk, Cootie Williams, Bernie Hanighen) – 3:15
 "Sleep" (Adam Geibel, Earl Burtnett) – 2:48
 "Soft Winds" (Benny Goodman, Fred Royal) – 6:25
 "Springsville" (Carisi) – 3:11
 "Plain Bill from Bluesville" (Carisi) – 4:06
 "Home" (Peter van Steeden, Geoffrey Clarkson, Harry Clarkson) – 3:18

Personnel
Urbie Green – trombone
John Carisi – trumpet, arranger
Joe Wilder, Nick Travis, Phil Sunkel, Doc Severinsen – trumpet
Chauncey Welsh, Jack Satterfield, Jack Green, Lou McGarity, Rex Peer – trombone
Bill Barber, Don Butterfield – tuba
Al Cohn, Ray Beckenstein – tenor saxophone
Sol Schlinger, Danny Bank – baritone saxophone
Dave McKenna – piano
Jack Lesberg, Vinnie Burke – bass
Osie Johnson – drums

References

Urbie Green albums
1956 albums
ABC Records albums
Albums recorded at Van Gelder Studio
Albums produced by Creed Taylor
Albums arranged by John Carisi